"Will You Wait for Me?" is a song by British singer-songwriter Kavana. The ballad was released on 8 March 1999 as the third single from his second album, Instinct (1998). The song peaked at number 29 on the UK Singles Chart and at number 22 on the New Zealand Singles Chart. The track is one of Kavana's personal favourites in his repertoire.

Background and release
"Will You Wait for Me?" was recorded during mid-1998 and was released as a single on 8 March 1999. It is Kavana's favourite song on the second album. He said in an interview, "This song is one of my favourites on the album (Instinct), actually – I've never done a ballad before! It's about a friend of mine who died of cancer, and writing it was great therapy in a way. Hopefully, this is the defining one for me." It was produced by Absolute.

Track listings
UK CD1 and cassette single, Australian CD single
 "Will You Wait for Me" – 3:48
 "Will You Wait for Me"  – 4:13
 "Him or Me" – 3:38

UK CD2
 "Will You Wait for Me"  – 3:48
 "Will You Wait for Me"  – 4:13
 "Will You Wait for Me"  – 6:07
 "Will You Wait for Me"

Charts

References

External links
 

1990s ballads
1998 songs
1999 singles
Song recordings produced by Absolute (production team)
Songs written by Andy Watkins
Songs written by Paul Wilson (songwriter)
Virgin Records singles